The Men's tandem 1 km time trial B at the 2022 Commonwealth Games, was part of the cycling programme, which took place on 29 July 2022. This event was for blind and visually impaired cyclists riding with a sighted pilot.

Records
Prior to this competition, the existing world and Games records were as follows:

Schedule
The schedule is as follows:

All times are British Summer Time (UTC+1)

References

Cycling at the Commonwealth Games – Men's tandem 1 km time trial B
Men's tandem 1 km time trial B